Salteras is a city in the Province of Seville, Spain. It has a population of 11,854 inhabitants (2018 INE). It borders Olivares to the west, Gerena to the northwest, Guillena to the north, La Algaba to the northeast, Valencina to the east and Espartinas to the south. Known to the Romans as Paesula, its origins are ancient. It was historically part of the Comarca del Aljarafe, but now legally forms part of the Comarca Metropolitana de Sevilla.

Gallery

References

External links
Salteras - Sistema de Información Multiterritorial de Andalucía

Municipalities of the Province of Seville